Tomáš Franek (born May 10, 1994) is a Czech professional ice hockey forward for KS Cracovia of the Polska Hokej Liga.

Franek made his Czech Extraliga debut playing with HC Oceláři Třinec during the 2014-15 Czech Extraliga season.

References

External links

1994 births
Living people
Czech ice hockey forwards
SHK Hodonín players
LHK Jestřábi Prostějov players
HC Oceláři Třinec players
Podhale Nowy Targ players
MKS Cracovia (ice hockey) players
HC Frýdek-Místek players
People from Nový Bor
Sportspeople from the Liberec Region
Czech expatriate ice hockey people
Expatriate ice hockey players in Poland
Czech expatriate sportspeople in Poland